The Sentinel Space Telescope was a space observatory to be developed  by Ball Aerospace & Technologies for the B612 Foundation. The B612 Foundation is dedicated to protecting the Earth from dangerous asteroid strikes and Sentinel was to be the Foundation's first spacecraft tangibly to address that mission.

The telescope would have orbited the Sun in a Venus-like orbit (i.e. between Earth and the Sun). This orbit would allow it clearly to view the night half of the sky every 20 days, and pick out objects that are often difficult, if not impossible, to see in advance from Earth." Sentinel would have had an operational mission life of six and a half to ten years.

After NASA terminated their funding agreement with the B612 Foundation in October 2015 and the private fundraising goals could not be met, the Foundation eventually opted for an alternative approach using a constellation of much smaller spacecraft under study . NASA/JPL's NEOCam has been proposed instead.

History 

The B612 project grew out of a one-day workshop on asteroid deflection organized by Piet Hut and Ed Lu at NASA Johnson Space Center, Houston, Texas on October 20, 2001. Participants Rusty Schweickart, Clark Chapman, Piet Hut, and Ed Lu established the B612 Foundation on October 7, 2002. The Foundation originally planned to launch Sentinel by December 2016 and to begin data retrieval no later than 6 months after successful positioning.
In April 2013, the plan had moved out to launching on a SpaceX Falcon 9 in 2018, following preliminary design review in 2014, and critical design review in 2015.

, B612 was attempting to raise approximately $450 million in total to fund the total development and launch cost of Sentinel, at a rate of some $30 to $40 million per year. That funding profile excludes the advertised 2018 launch date.

Cancellation 

After NASA terminated their $30 million funding agreement with the B612 Foundation in October 2015 and the private fundraising did not achieve its goals, the Foundation eventually opted for an alternative approach using a constellation of much smaller spacecraft which is under study . NASA/JPL's NEOCam has been proposed instead.

Mission 

Unlike similar projects to search for near-Earth asteroids or near-Earth objects (NEOs) such as NASA's Near-Earth Object Program, Sentinel would have orbited between Earth and the Sun. Since the Sun would therefore always have been behind the lens of the telescope, it would have never inhibited the telescope's ability to detect NEOs and Sentinel would have been able to perform continuous observation and analysis.

Sentinel was anticipated to be capable of detecting 90% of the asteroids greater than 140 meters in diameter that exist in Earth's orbit, which pose existential risk to humanity. The B612 Foundation estimates that approximately half a million asteroids in Earth's neighbourhood equal or exceed the one that struck Tunguska in 1908. It was planned to be launched atop the Falcon 9 rocket designed and manufactured by the private aerospace company SpaceX in 2019, and to be maneuvered into position with the help of the gravity of Venus. Data gathered by the Sentinel Project would have been provided through an existing network of scientific data-sharing that includes NASA and academic institutions such as the Minor Planet Center in Cambridge, Massachusetts.

Given the satellite's telescopic accuracy, Sentinel's data was speculated to prove valuable for future missions in such fields as asteroid mining.

Specifications 

The telescope was intended to measure  by  mass  and would have orbited the Sun at a distance of  approximately in the same orbital distance as Venus. It would have employed infrared astronomy methods to identify asteroids against the cold of outer space. The B612 Foundation worked in partnership with Ball Aerospace to construct Sentinel's  aluminum mirror, which would have captured the large field of view.
"Sentinel will scan in the 7- to 15-micron wavelength using a 0.5-meter infrared telescope across a 5.5 by 2-deg. field of view. The [infrared] IR array would have consisted of 16 detectors, and coverage would have scanned a 200-degree, full-angle field of regard."

Features 

Key features included:
 Most capable NEO detection system in operation;
 200 degree anti-sun Field of Regard, with a 2×5.5 degree Field of View at any point in time: scans 165 square degrees per hour looking for moving objects;
 Precise pointing accuracy to sub-pixel resolution for imaging revisit, using the detector fine steering capability;
 Designed for highly autonomous, reliable operation requiring only weekly ground contact;
 Designed for 6.5 to 10 years of surveying operations. Actively cooled to 40K using a Ball Aerospace two-stage, closed-cycle Stirling-cycle cryocooler;
 Ability to follow up on objects of interest.

Issues

See also 

 4179 Toutatis
 Asteroid deflection
 Asteroid mining
 Asteroid Terrestrial-impact Last Alert System (ATLAS)
 B612 Foundation
 Lists of telescopes
 Near-Earth Object Surveillance Mission
 NEOShield
 Spaceguard
 Spaceguard Foundation

References 

Asteroid surveys
Infrared telescopes
Minor-planet discovering observatories
Near-Earth object tracking
Planetary defense
Space telescopes
Science and technology in the San Francisco Bay Area